Insulinoma-associated protein 1 is a protein that in humans is encoded by the INSM1 gene.

Function 

Insulinoma-associated 1 (INSM1) gene is intronless and encodes a protein containing both a zinc finger DNA-binding domain and a putative prohormone domain. This gene is a sensitive marker for neuroendocrine differentiation of human lung tumors.

Interactions 

INSM1 has been shown to interact with SORBS1.

References

Further reading